Khayrullo Nazriev (born 24 July 1972) is a Tajikistani judoka. He competed in the men's half-heavyweight event at the 1996 Summer Olympics.

References

External links

1972 births
Living people
Tajikistani male judoka
Olympic judoka of Tajikistan
Judoka at the 1996 Summer Olympics
Place of birth missing (living people)
Asian Games medalists in judo
Judoka at the 1994 Asian Games
Asian Games bronze medalists for Tajikistan
Medalists at the 1994 Asian Games
20th-century Tajikistani people
21st-century Tajikistani people